Darma Udumtsen, better known by his nickname Langdarma ("Mature Bull" or "Dharma the Bull") was most likely the last Tibetan Emperor who probably reigned from 838 to 841 CE. Early sources call him Tri Darma "King Dharma". His domain extended beyond Tibet to include Dunhuang and neighbouring Chinese regions.

By tradition Langdarma is held to have been anti-Buddhist and a follower of Bon. He is attributed with the assassination of his brother, King Ralpacan, in 838 AD and he is generally held to have persecuted Buddhists. According to traditional accounts, during the first two years of his rule, Langdarma remained a Buddhist, but under the influence of Wégyel Toré, he became a follower of Bon. Following his persecution of Buddhism Atiśa was called from Sumatra to restore Buddhism to Tibet.

The anti-Buddhist portrayal of this king has been questioned by several historians, most prominently Zuiho Yamaguchi.

Langdarma's reign was plagued by external troubles. The Uyghur Khaganate to the north collapsed due to a revolt by the Yenisei Kirghiz in year 840 and many displaced people fled to Tibet. According to one source, he only reigned for a year and a half, while others give six or thirteen years. According to traditional accounts, a Buddhist hermit or monk named Lhalung Pelgyi Dorje assassinated Langdarma in 842 or 846. His death was followed by civil war and the dissolution of the Tibetan empire, leading to the Era of Fragmentation.

Langdarma is said to have had two sons: Tride Yumten, by his first wife and Namde Ösung by his second wife. They apparently competed for power, the former ruling over the central kingdom of Ü, and the other ruling over the "left wing", probably the eastern territories.

One of Langdarma's grandsons, Kyidé Nyima Gön, conquered Ngari in the late 10th century, although his army originally numbered only 300 men. Kyidé Nyima Gön founded several towns and castles and he apparently ordered the construction of the main sculptures at Shey. "In an inscription he says he had them made for the religious benefit of the Tsanpo (the dynastic title of his father and ancestors), and of all the people of Ngaris (Western Tibet). This shows that already in this generation Langdarma's opposition to Buddhism had disappeared." Shey, just 15 km east of modern Leh, was the ancient seat of the Ladakhi kings.

In Tibetan Buddhist culture, Darma Udumtsen was said to be the incarnation of Gośīrṣa, the bull-head guardian of hell, thus he got the nickname, Langdarma, literally, "Darma, the bull".

Notes

External links
http://www.haiweitrails.com/timeline_tibet.htm (accessed:  Sunday January 14, 2007)

Tibetan emperors
9th-century rulers in Asia
Anti-Buddhism
9th century in religion
9th-century Tibetan people
9th-century births
840s deaths
Date of birth unknown
Date of death unknown